Paul Kowalski (born May 13, 1981) is a Polish-British film director and screenwriter based in Los Angeles.

Life & Career

Kowalski was born in Epsom, England to Polish immigrants and raised in North Africa, England, the Middle East, Southeast Asia, Poland and across the USA. While living in Riyadh, Saudi Arabia in the early 1990s, he worked as an actor for a children's program on English-language channel Saudi TV-2.

Kowalski studied literature and writing at Brown University, where he also made his earliest films. He later received his MFA in film directing at the AFI Conservatory.

His films center around identity, exile and obsession, often featuring dark psychologies and the supernatural. As a film director and screenwriter, Kowalski has won recognition from the American Society of Cinematographers, Austin Film Festival, Beijing Film Academy, CINE, Aesthetica Short Film Festival, Raindance Film Festival, and Beverly Hills Film Festival among others.

His debut feature, Paper Tiger, premiered at Austin Film Festival in 2020, winning the Audience Award and a Jury mention. The film was sold by The Gersh Agency and distributed by Gravitas Ventures.

In 2021, Kowalski was named one of “25 Screenwriters To Watch” by Austin Film Festival.

Personal
Kowalski is married to actress Sorel Carradine.

His uncle, Lech Kowalski, directed punk rock documentary, D.O.A.: A Rite of Passage, and East of Paradise which won at the Venice Film Festival. The film is about Paul Kowalski's grandmother's escape from a Soviet workcamp during World War II.

External links 
Official Website

References

1981 births
English film directors
Polish film directors
Polish screenwriters
English screenwriters
English male screenwriters
21st-century British screenwriters
Brown University alumni
AFI Conservatory alumni
People from Epsom
English people of Polish descent
British emigrants to the United States
English emigrants to the United States
Polish emigrants to the United States
Living people